Winston-Salem/Forsyth County Schools (WS/FCS) is a school district in Forsyth County, North Carolina. WS/FCS has over 80 schools in its system, and it serves 54,984 students every year. WS/FCS was formed in 1963 by the merger of the Forsyth County School System and the Winston-Salem School System. WS/FCS is now the fourth largest school system in North Carolina, and it is the 81st largest in the United States. WS/FCS is also the most diverse school district in North Carolina.

Elementary schools

 Ashley Elementary
 Bolton Elementary
 Brunson Elementary
 Caleb's Creek Elementary
 Cash Elementary
 Clemmons Elementary
 Cook Elementary
 Diggs-Latham Elementary
 Easton Elementary
 Forest Park Elementary
 Julian Gibson Elementary School 
 Griffith Elementary
 Hall-Woodward Elementary
 Ibraham Elementary
 Jefferson Elementary
 Kernersville Elementary
 Kimberly Park Elementary
 Kimmel Farm Elementary
 Konnoak Elementary
 Lewisville Elementary
 Meadowlark Elementary
 Middle Fork Elementary
 Mineral Springs Elementary
 Moore Elementary
 Morgan Elementary
 North Hills Elementary
 Old Richmond Elementary
 Old Town Elementary
 Petree Elementary
 Piney Grove Elementary
 Rural Hall Elementary
 Sedge Garden Elementary
 Sherwood Forest Elementary
 Smith Farm Elementary
 South Fork Elementary
 Southwest Elementary
 Speas Elementary
 The Downtown
 Union Cross Elementary
 Vienna Elementary
 Walkertown Elementary
 Ward Elementary
 Whitaker Elementary

Middle schools

 Clemmons Middle
 East Forsyth Middle
 Flat Rock Middle
 Hanes Magnet Middle
 Jacket Academy
 Jefferson Middle
 Kernersville Middle
 Lewisville Middle
 Meadowlark Middle
 Mineral Springs Middle
 Northwest Middle
 Paisley IB Magnet
 Philo-Hill Magnet Academy
 Southeast Middle
 Walkertown Middle
 Wiley Magnet Middle
 Winston-Salem Prep Academy

High schools

 Atkins Academic and Technology High 
 Career Center
 Carver High
 Early College of Forsyth
 East Forsyth High
 Forsyth Middle College
 Glenn High
 John F. Kennedy High
 Mount Tabor High
 North Forsyth High
 Parkland High
 Reagan High
 Reynolds High
 Walkertown High
 West Forsyth High
 Winston-Salem Prep Academy

Non-traditional schools

 Carter High 
 The Children's Center (PK-5)
 Kingswood High
 Lowrance Middle 
 Main Street Academy (6-12)
 Special Children's School (PK-5)
 Virtual Academy (PK-12)

See also

 List of school districts in North Carolina

References

External links
 

Education in Forsyth County, North Carolina
Education in Winston-Salem, North Carolina
School districts in North Carolina
School districts established in 1963